Noelia Zeballos Melgar (born 2 May 1994) is a Bolivian tennis player.

Zeballos has a career-high singles ranking by the Women's Tennis Association (WTA) of 447, reached on 27 February 2023. She also has a career-high WTA doubles ranking of 299, achieved on 3 October 2022. Zeballos has won three ITF singles titles and 14 ITF doubles titles.

Playing for Bolivia Fed Cup team, she has a win–loss record of 27–27 (as of March 2023).

Her brother Federico is also a professional tennis player.

ITF Circuit finals

Singles: 6 (3 titles, 3 runner–ups)

Doubles: 34 (14 titles, 20 runner–ups)

Notes

External links
 
 
 

1994 births
Living people
Bolivian female tennis players
Sportspeople from Santa Cruz de la Sierra
Competitors at the 2018 South American Games
Pan American Games medalists in tennis
Tennis players at the 2019 Pan American Games
Pan American Games silver medalists for Bolivia
Competitors at the 2010 South American Games
Tennis players at the 2011 Pan American Games
Medalists at the 2019 Pan American Games
20th-century Bolivian women
21st-century Bolivian women